Juan Diego Ruiz Moreno (14 December 1942 – 28 April 2022), professionally known as Juan Diego, was a Spanish actor who appeared on stage, in television and film productions since 1957. He starred in films such as The Holy Innocents, The 7th Day, Dragon Rapide, París-Tombuctú and You're the One.

Performing with a raspy voice for much of his career, he is often associated with abrupt, violent, and authoritarian roles, having a knack for nailing fascist-like characters. His most known television role was the foul-mouthed Don Lorenzo in Los hombres de Paco, popular for the idiom 

Also known for his left-wing political activism, Juan Diego took part in the struggle for advancing film workers' labor rights in Spain.

Biography 
Juan Diego Ruiz Moreno was born on 14 December 1942 in Bormujos, and spent his childhood there. He made his acting debut in theatre in 1957. Key stage credits throughout his career include performances in plays such as Olvida los tambores, El lector por horas, La gata sobre el tejado de zinc, and Yo me bajo en la próxima, ¿y usted?

After studying performing arts in Seville, Juan Diego moved to Madrid in order to develop his acting career, featuring in Televisión Española shows (most notably in plenty of Estudio 1 plays), likewise making his film debut in Eloy de la Iglesia's Fantasía... 3 (1966).

The first of his two children was born in 1970. His left-wing political activism did not end upon the death of dictator Francisco Franco, but continued during the Transition and beyond. Decades later, he would also be seen demonstrating in Spain against the Iraq War.

Diego starred as Marcos, a popular television host and member of a post-Francoist party (and scorned husband), alongside Ana Belén and a big black dog in a love triangle in the 1977 zoophilia-themed film La criatura.

He landed a breakthrough role with his performance in Mario Camus' 1984 film The Holy Innocents, playing Señorito Iván, a repulsive authoritarian landlord from an Extremaduran , obsessed with game hunting and disdainful of his workers. He earned his first Goya Award nomination at the first edition of the awards celebrated in 1987, for his leading role as Francisco Franco in the period drama Dragon Rapide, which tracks the early stages of the Spanish Civil War. He earned another best actor nomination for his role as Saint John of the Cross in the 1989 film The Dark Night, his first collaboration with Carlos Saura. 

He played a  again in the 1988 film Jarrapellejos, as Saturnino, a rapist and murderer. He portrayed another historical figure by playing the title character of the 1991 Mexican film Cabeza de Vaca. He won his first Goya Award for his supporting role in The Dumbfounded King (1991), playing Father Villaescusa, a 17th-century scheming friar characterised by his "arrogant, enervated, and irascible" gaze. He featured in supporting roles in the 1992 film Jamón, jamón and in the 1993 film Banderas, the Tyrant, respectively portraying Manuel, the owner of the Sansón underwear factory and father of José Luis (Jordi Mollá), and the  Nacho Veguillas, a sycophant pandering to megalomaniac dictator Santos Banderas, portrayed by Gian Maria Volonté.

Juan Diego appeared in Luis García Berlanga's last full-length film  (1999), playing the anarchic nudist Boronat, a role that won him his second Goya Award for Best Supporting Actor. He starred as the title character in the 2002 television miniseries , directed by Benito Zambrano, in a story based on true events in which Juan Diego's character enters the underworld to find those responsible for the murder of his son.

Juan Diego's supporting performance in the 2003 comedy Torremolinos 73 as Don Carlos, a porn film producer, landed him another Goya award nomination. Another of his collaborations with Carlos Saura, his supporting performance in the 2004 film The 7th Day portraying Antonio Izquierdo (an illiterate man and co-perpetrator of the Puerto Hurraco massacre), earned him Goya award nominations in consecutive years.

The television role earning Juan Diego the most public recognition was that of the foul-mouthed Don Lorenzo in the crime comedy-drama television series Los hombres de Paco, whose original broadcasting run spanned from 2005 to 2010. The series was picked up for a revival in 2020, leading up to the release of new episodes in 2021 featuring Juan Diego in a recurring role.

Juan Diego won his only Goya Award for Best Leading Actor (and third overall) for his performance in Víctor García León's 2006 drama Go Away from Me, playing an aging thespian and father to a freeloading son portrayed by Juan Diego Botto.

In his later career, Juan Diego often worked for newcoming directors in films such as Anochece en la India (2014), Can't Say Goodbye (2017), The Cover (2021), or Víctor Conde's Venus, a posthumously released work. He also featured in the 2011 political thriller  playing general Alfonso Armada, a member of the clique of officers who plotted the 1981 attempted coup d'etat in Spain; in the 2012 drama Todo es silencio, portraying Mariscal, a local cacique with a grip over maritime smuggling; in the 2017 Catalan period drama Uncertain Glory, playing Cagorcio, the abusive father of femme fatale Carlana; and in the martial arts film Xtreme (2021), playing Ricardo, an aging crimelord.

Juan Diego died at Clínica de la Zarzuela in Madrid on 28 April 2022. Many fellow actors and friends attended his lying in repose at the Teatro Español, including Marisa Paredes, Ana Belén, Víctor Manuel, Imanol Arias, Gabino Diego, Eduard Fernández, Manolo Solo, Emilio Gutierrez Caba, Carmelo Gómez, Mariano Barroso, and María José Goyanes.

Filmography

Film

Television

Accolades

References

External links
 

1942 births
2022 deaths
Spanish male film actors
Best Actor Goya Award winners
Best Supporting Actor Goya Award winners
Spanish male stage actors
Spanish male television actors
20th-century Spanish male actors
21st-century Spanish male actors
People from Seville
Male actors from Andalusia